Noer is a municipality in the district of Rendsburg-Eckernförde, in Schleswig-Holstein, Germany.

See also
 Prince Frederick of Schleswig-Holstein-Sonderburg-Augustenburg

References

Municipalities in Schleswig-Holstein
Rendsburg-Eckernförde